Cayman Islands Cricket Association (CICA) is the official governing body of the sport of cricket in the Cayman Islands, a British overseas territory. The organisation's headquarters are in George Town, Grand Cayman. Established in 1970, the CICA has been a member of the International Cricket Council (ICC) since 1997.

History

See also
 Cayman Islands national cricket team
 Cayman Islands women's national cricket team

References
 ICC associate members: Cayman Islands

External links
Official website
Cricinfo Cayman Islands

Cricket administration
Cricket
Cricket in the Cayman Islands
Sports organizations established in 1970
1970 establishments in the Cayman Islands